Christine Anna Maria Theiss, maiden name Hennig, born February 22, 1980, in Greiz, East Germany, is a  German female kickboxer.  Since 2007, she is the world champion in professional full contact kickboxing in the World Kickboxing Association (WKA).  On December 7, 2012, she became the Super lightweight world champion  in full contact kickboxing of the International Sport Karate Association (ISKA) and World Kickboxing and Karate Union (WKU).  She lost her WKU championship in a title fight to Olga Stavrova on June 7, 2013, but regained the title on December 13, 2013, by defeating Olga Stavrova in a closely contested 10-round decision  in what was announced to be her last fight.

Personal life
In 1984 Theiss moved with her parents from the GDR to Bayreuth. There she attended elementary school and high school. She then worked as a medical assistant in the parental practice in Bayreuth. From 2001 to 2007, she studied medicine at the Ludwig-Maximilians University in Munich. In November 2007, she completed the study with the state examination.  In December 2008, she received her doctorate in medicine (Dr. med.).  Since March 2012, she is a host for the German version of The Biggest Loser Germany on Sat.1. From 2005 to 2012 she was elected as "Munich's Sportwoman of the Year" by the readers of the evening newspaper Abendzeitung. Since 2005, Theiss is married to the cardiologist Hans Theiss and lives in the Munich district of Schwabing.In 2016 she gave birth to her first child a daughter.

Career
From 1988 to 2000 she learned semi contact kickboxing in the Karate Dojo Aleksandar eV in Bayreuth. In 1998, she became the German Champion. In 2003, she switched to full-contact kickboxing at the Kampfsportzentrum Steko in Munich. She successively became German champion, European silver medalist, World runner-up and 2005 Amateur World Champion (WKA). Since early 2006, Theiss fights as a professional kickboxer. She is trained by the former kickboxing world champions Mladen Steko and Pavlica Steko. Mladen Steko is also her manager. Having won 22 world championship fights, Theiss is considered to be one of the most successful professional kickboxers of all times and a celebrity in Germany. Since January 2011, she has an exclusive contract for the television broadcasts of her bouts with Sat.1 (Steko's Fight Night). On 7 December 2012, she fought for the first time according to the rules of the ISKA and WKU, winning the world championship title winning the world championship title in the weight class of 62.5 kg. On February 22, 2013, she defeated Cathy Le-Mée, the WKA and WKU world champion in the weight class of 65 kg per KO in the fifth round.  On April 18, 2013, she announced that she would end her career at the end of 2013. She lost her fight against Russian kickboxer Olga Stavrova on June 7, 2013, in Munich after ten rounds by split decision.  After the fight, she announced her desire to fight a revanche against Olga Stavrova.   She won that rematch and regained the title on December 13, 2013, by defeating her in a closely contested 10-round decision.  It was announced to be her last fight.

Kickboxing Record

References

External links

 web page of Christine Theiss
 dissertation of Christine Anna Maria Theiss (PDF; 1,04 MB)

1980 births
German female kickboxers
Living people
People from Greiz (district)
Sportspeople from Thuringia